The 1982 East Coast Conference men's basketball tournament was held March 5–7, 1982.  The champion gained and an automatic berth to the NCAA tournament.

Bracket and results

* denotes overtime game

References

East Coast Conference (Division I) men's basketball tournament
Tournament
1982 in sports in Pennsylvania
Basketball competitions in Philadelphia
College basketball tournaments in Pennsylvania
March 1982 sports events in the United States